The Thalanyji, also spelt Thalandji, Dhalandji, and other variations, are an Aboriginal Australian people in the Pilbara region of Western Australia.

Country
Tindale thought that their presence around Exmouth Gulf reflected late migration to that area.

Society
The Thalanyji practised neither circumcision or subincision.

Language

The Thalanyji spoke the Thalanyji language, but this is thought to be now extinct.

Alternative names
 Talanji, Talanjee, Dalandji, Talaindji, Talainji, Tallainji, Dalaindji
 Djalendi, Talandi
 Tallainga
Dhalandji, Dalandji, Djalandji, Inikurdira, Jinigudira, Talandji, Yinikurtira, Dalaindji, Dalangi, Dalanjdji, Dalendi, Djalandi, Djalendi, Mulgarnu, Talaindji, Talainji, Talandi, Talangee, Talanjee, Talanji, Talinje, Tallainga, Tallainji, Taloinga, Thalanji, Tal lainga, Jinigudera, Jinigura, Jiniguri, Jarungura

Notes

Citations

Sources

Aboriginal peoples of Western Australia
Pilbara